Yohan International Christian School (YICS) is a school located in Shinjuku, Tokyo, Japan.

History
YICS was founded in 2006 under Yohan Tokyo Christ Church.

References

External links

 

American international schools in Japan
Christian schools in Japan
High schools in Tokyo
International schools in Tokyo